The following is about the qualification rules and the quota allocation for the speed skating events at the 2014 Winter Olympics.

Qualification
Each NOC is allowed to delegate a maximal number of ten men and ten women speed skaters who reached the qualification criteria. A proposal of the Dutch skating association (KNSB) to add an extra athlete, especially for the team pursuit event, was rejected at the congress of the international federation ISU in Kuala Lumpur in June 2012.

Qualification times 
The qualification times were released in July 2013. The women's times stay the same from Vancouver except for a more stringent standard in the 3000 m, while the men's qualification times have all slightly decreased.

Pre-qualification 
Every nation that would not achieve any quota places in the 2013–14 ISU Speed Skating World Cup could be allocated one spot based on the results in the previous season if one skater would have achieved at least the following result. For the 500, 1000, 1500 meters, 3000 meters women, and 5000 meters men, a place among the top 16 of the 2012–13 ISU Speed Skating World Cup or the 2013 World Single Distance Speed Skating Championships; for the 5000 meters women and 10000 meters men, a place among the top 8 of the 2012–13 ISU Speed Skating World Cup or the 2013 World Single Distance Speed Skating Championships. Also, as hosts, both the Russian men and women will be allocated one of eight spots in the team pursuit events.

The following table shows which countries met these criteria for which distance.

Current quotas
Qualification standings after the final World Cup. Current quotas as of 23 December 2013:

References

Qualification for the 2014 Winter Olympics
Qualification